Trifolium tomentosum, the woolly clover, is a species of annual herb in the family Fabaceae. They have a self-supporting growth form and compound, broad leaves. Individuals can grow to 8.9 cm.

Sources

References 

tomentosum
Flora of Malta